Mira Huhta (born 28 October 1987) is a Finnish retired ice hockey player and former member of the Finnish national ice hockey team. She won a bronze medal while representing Finland at the 2011 IIHF Women's World Championship.

Playing career 
Huhta played 316 games in the Naisten Liiga and its predecessor, the Naisten SM-Saija, and concluded her career with a total of 195 points from 44 goals and 151 assists. She is a three-time Aurora Borealis Cup winner and was named to the Naisten Liiga All-Star Team in 2017.

She participated in a national team training camp for the 2018 Winter Olympics, but was not selected to the final roster.

References

External links
 

Living people
1987 births
Ice hockey people from Helsinki
Finnish women's ice hockey defencemen
HPK Kiekkonaiset players
Espoo Blues Naiset players